Earth vs. the Flying Saucers (a.k.a. Invasion of the Flying Saucers and Flying Saucers from Outer Space) is a 1956 American science fiction film from Columbia Pictures. It was produced by Charles H. Schneer, directed by Fred F. Sears, and stars Hugh Marlowe and Joan Taylor. The stop-motion animation special effects were created by Ray Harryhausen. The storyline was suggested by the bestselling 1953 non-fiction book Flying Saucers from Outer Space by Maj. Donald Keyhoe. The film was released as a double feature with The Werewolf.

Plot
Scientist Dr. Russell Marvin and his new bride Carol are driving to work when a flying saucer appears overhead. With no proof of the encounter other than a tape recording of the ship's sound, Dr. Marvin is hesitant to notify his superiors. He is in charge of Project Skyhook, an American space program that has already launched ten research satellites into orbit. General Hanley, Carol's father, informs Marvin that many of the satellites have since fallen back to Earth. Marvin admits that he has lost contact with all of them and privately suspects alien involvement. The Marvins then witness the 11th falling from the sky shortly after launch.

When a saucer lands at Skyhook the next day, a group of aliens in metallic suits exit, and the infantry guards open fire, killing one alien, while others and the saucer are protected by a force field. The aliens proceed to kill everyone at the facility but the Marvins; General Hanley is captured and taken away in the saucer. Too late, Russell discovers and decodes a message on his tape recorder: the aliens wanted to meet with Dr. Marvin and landed in peace at Skyhook for that purpose but they were instead met with violence.

Marvin contacts the aliens by radio and sneaks away to meet them, followed closely by Carol and Major Huglin. They and a pursuing motorcycle patrol officer are taken aboard a saucer, where the aliens have extracted knowledge directly from the general's brain. The aliens explain that they are the last of their species, having fled from their destroyed solar system. They are extremely aged and are kept alive only by their protective garments. They have shot down all the launched satellites, fearing them as weapons. As proof of their power, the aliens give Dr. Marvin the coordinates of a naval destroyer that opened fire on them, and which they have since destroyed. Horrified by the cold, unempathic nature of the aliens, Carol begins to break down, and the patrol officer, despite an attempt by Marvin to stop him, pulls his revolver and fires on the aliens; the aliens subject him to the same mind control process as General Hanley. The aliens state that they will eventually return Hanley and the patrol officer. As the interaction continues, Carol becomes increasingly irrational, while Marvin tries to remain calm. Major Huglin and the Marvins are released with the message that the aliens want to meet with the world's leaders in 56 days in Washington, D.C. to negotiate an occupation of Earth.

Dr. Marvin's later observations lead to the discovery that the aliens' protective suits are made of solidified electricity and grant them enhanced auditory perception. Marvin develops a counter-weapon against their flying saucers, which he later successfully tests against a single saucer. As they escape, the aliens jettison Hanley and the patrol officer, who fall to their deaths. Groups of alien saucers then attack Washington, Paris, London, and Moscow, and resistance by conventional weapons is futile. But they are destroyed by Dr. Marvin's sonic weapon. The defenders also discover that the aliens can be easily killed by small arms gunfire when they are outside the force fields of their saucers. Upon repelling the attack and no further threats anticipated, Project Skyhook is reestablished with Dr. Marvin once again placed in charge.

Cast
 Hugh Marlowe as Dr. Russell A. Marvin
 Joan Taylor as Carol Marvin
 Donald Curtis as Major Huglin
 Morris Ankrum as Brig. Gen. John Hanley
 John Zaremba as Prof. Kanter
 Thomas Browne Henry as Vice-Admiral Enright
 Grandon Rhodes as General Edmunds
 Larry J. Blake as the motorcycle policeman
 Charles Evans as Dr. Alberts
 Harry Lauter as Cutting, Kanter's technician
 Paul Frees as Aliens (uncredited voice)

Production

Visual effects

Ray Harryhausen used stop-motion animation to create the scenes of the flying spacecraft. For increased realism in the scenes depicting saucers crashing into monuments and government buildings, he also animated falling masonry. Some animation of figures was used to show the aliens emerging from the saucers. Much stock footage was used, including the shots, during the invasion, of a missile launch and of batteries of 90 mm M3 guns firing. Film of the destruction of HMS Barham during World War II was used to depict the sinking of a destroyer. Scenes showing satellite launches use footage of a Viking rocket takeoff and a failed V-2 rocket launch. A scene depicting planes crashing after being hit by an alien ray utilizes film of a 1944 accident at an airshow near Spokane, Washington involving military aircraft.

The film's iconic flying saucer design—a stationary central cabin encircled by a rotating outer ring with slotted vanes in it—matches eyewitness descriptions recorded by Maj. Donald Keyhoe in his best-selling non-fiction book about UFOs. At a tribute to Harryhausen held in Sydney, Australia, the animator said that he consulted with well-known 1950s UFO "contactee" George Adamski about the depiction of the flying saucers in the film. He noted that Adamski had become quite paranoid by that time.

The voice of the aliens was produced by recording Paul Frees—in an uncredited role—on reel-to-reel audio tape. The speed control was then rapidly turned up and down by hand while the tape was played back, which had the effect of causing Frees's voice to waver in pitch as well as speed.

Reception
A reviewer for Variety commented that the special effects were the real stars of Earth vs. the Flying Saucers: "This exploitation program does a satisfactory job of entertaining in the science-fiction class. The technical effects created by Ray Harryhausen come off excellently in the Charles H. Schneer production, adding the required out-of-this-world visual touch to the screenplay, taken from a screen story by Curt Siodmak, suggested by Major Donald E. Keyhoe's Flying Saucers from Outer Space." The Los Angeles Times was also fairly positive, writing that although the saucers "look like art department concoctions", the film still "has a sort of pseudoscientific charm". The Monthly Film Bulletin gave a negative review, stating that the "semi-documentary technique" was "pretentious" and the use of stock footage, "crude model-work", and most of the best-known science-fiction clichés made the movie "a long-winded and rather bleak invasion from outer space". Bosley Crowther of The New York Times was also negative, calling it "utter nonsense that is childishly and humorlessly put forth".

Earth vs. the Flying Saucers spawned a subgenre of subsequent flying saucer films, many of which incorporated elements contributed by Harryhausen to the seminal movie. In an article for The New York Times, film reviewer Hal Erickson noted, "Anyone who's seen the 1996 science-fiction lampoon Mars Attacks! may have trouble watching Earth vs. the Flying Saucers with a straight face". The later film could be seen as a campy homage to the era, especially the innovations of Earth vs. the Flying Saucers.

Legacy
The four-issue comic book miniseries Flying Saucers vs. the Earth (2008), released by TidalWave Productions as part of their Ray Harryhausen Signature Series, reimagines the events of the film from the perspective of the alien invaders, identified in the comics as the Sons of Aberrann. A preview of the first issue was included on the 50th-anniversary DVD release of the film.

The film is partially featured in the Breaking Bad episode "Cancer Man".

The movie was Shown on the Weigel Broadcasting show Svengoolie on January 22, 2022 on MeTV and rebroadcast on WCIU-TV (the flagship station of Weigel) the Saturday after.

See also
 Fearful Attack of the Flying Saucers (1956 Japanese independent film)

References

Notes

Bibliography

 Hagerty, Jack and Jon Rogers. The Saucer Fleet. Burlington, Ontario, Canada: Apogee Books, 2008. .
 Hankin, Mike. Ray Harryhausen: Master of the Majicks, Vol. 2: The American Films. Los Angeles, California: Archive Editions, 2008. .
 Jacobs, David. "Flying Saucers from Outer Space — The inspiration behind Earth vs. the Flying Saucers". in Wilson, S. Michael. Monster Rally: Mutants, Monsters, Madness. West Orange, New Jersey: Idea Men Production, 2008. .
 Warren, Bill. Keep Watching the Skies: American Science Fiction Films of the Fifties, 21st Century Edition. Jefferson, North Carolina: McFarland & Company, 2009, (First edition 1982). .

External links

 
 
 
 

Alien invasions in films
American black-and-white films
American science fiction films
Apocalyptic films
Columbia Pictures films
Films about extraterrestrial life
Films based on American novels
Films based on non-fiction books
Films based on science fiction novels
Films directed by Fred F. Sears
Films produced by Charles H. Schneer
Films set in London
Films set in Moscow
Films set in Paris
Films set in Washington, D.C.
Films using stop-motion animation
Films with screenplays by Curt Siodmak
1950s English-language films
1950s monster movies
1950s science fiction films
1956 films
Films set in 1956
1950s American films
Flying saucers
English-language science fiction films